Jack Thomas (born 3 June 1996) is an English footballer who plays for  side Ilkeston Town, where he plays as a midfielder.

Playing career

Mansfield Town
In September 2017 he joined Boston United on an initial month's loan.

He was released by Mansfield at the end of the 2017–18 season.

Tamworth (loan)
Tamworth confirmed the loan signing of Thomas on 13 February 2018 on a initial one month loan deal.

Basford United
It was announced that he had signed a one-year contract for Northern Premier League Premier Division side Basford United

Ilkeston Town
On 4 September 2020, Thomas signed for Northern Premier League Division One South East side Ilkeston Town, with manager Martin Carruthers describing the signing as a real coup for the club.

Tamworth

Thomas re-signed for Southern League Premier Division Central side Tamworth on 31 May 2021. Thomas made his second debut for Tamworth on the 14 August 2021, the opening day of the Southern League Premier Division Central season away at Royston Town, with his new club succumbing to a disappointing 3-0 defeat.

Thomas became a mainstay in the Tamworth line up, and scored his first goal on 9 November 2021 in an away Southern League Premier Division Central fixture against Bromsgrove Sporting, Thomas scored on the 16th minute to give Tamworth the lead with a long range effort that beat Bromsgrove Sporting goalkeeper Ákos Onódi. The game however finished 1-1.

On the 26 February 2022, Jack scored his second goal for Tamworth in a 6-0 demolition of Barwell in a home Southern League Premier Division Central fixture. Thomas scored the third goal of the match.

In total Thomas made 37 appearances for Tamworth, and scored two goals.

Ilkeston Town
Thomas resigned for Northern Premier League Division One Midlands side Ilkeston Town on 18 March 2022, the departure came as a shock to Tamworth, but manager Andy Peaks revealed that the move worked better geographically for Thomas.

Career statistics

Club

References

External links
 
 

1996 births
Living people
English footballers
People from Mansfield Woodhouse
Footballers from Nottinghamshire
Association football midfielders
English Football League players
National League (English football) players
Northern Premier League players
Southern Football League players
Mansfield Town F.C. players
Hednesford Town F.C. players
Barrow A.F.C. players
Boston United F.C. players
Tamworth F.C. players
Basford United F.C. players
Ilkeston Town F.C. players